Dashu is a town under the administration of Quanjiao County, Anhui, China. , it has two residential communities and 8 villages under its administration.

References 

Township-level divisions of Anhui
Quanjiao County